The Pteriomorphia comprise a subclass of saltwater clams, marine bivalve molluscs.  It contains several major orders, including the Arcida, Ostreida, Pectinida, Limida, Mytilida, and Pteriida.  It also contains some extinct and probably basal families, such as the Evyanidae, Colpomyidae, Bakevelliidae, Cassianellidae, and Lithiotidae.

This subclass of molluscs has lamellibranch gills, and is epibenthic.  Some attach to the substrate using a byssus.  The foot is reduced.  The mantle margins are not fused.  Gills are usually large and assist in feeding. This group includes the well known mussels, scallops, pen shells, and oysters.  It also includes the only members of the class bivalvia to have rudimentary eyes.

Photoreceptors 
Pteriomorphian bivalves possess five types of photoreceptors, each evolving independently and each associated with different clades within Pteriomorphia. There are cap eyespots, pigmented cups, compound eyes, concave mirror eyes, and invaginated eyes, each having evolved independently. The primary purpose of pteriomorphian eyes is to detect and respond to predators. As such, pteriomorphia respond to the presence of a shadow by retracting their siphon, adduction, digging, or some combination of the three. Beyond this shadow response, however, pteriomorphia typically do not respond to other visual stimuli. 

Pteriomorphia have much higher rates of eye loss than eye gain and studying eye loss and gain can yield insights into the mechanisms behind convergent evolution and the evolution and regression of complex traits. Eyes evolved exclusively in epifaunal lineages, and have been lost in some lineages that adopted infaunal and semi-infaunal lifestyles, suggesting a correlation between eye loss and adoption of infaunal or semi-infaunal lifestyles. Additionally, eyes in Pectinidae exhibit a reduction in functionality as habitat depth increases, ending in the complete absence of eyes in deep sea species.

Phylogeny

The cladogram is based on molecular phylogeny using mitochondrial (12S, 16S) and nuclear (18S, 28S, and H3) gene markers by Yaron Malkowsky and Annette Klussmann-Kolb in 2012.

2010 Taxonomy
In 2010 a new proposed classification system for the Bivalvia was published by Bieler, Carter & Coan revising the classification of the Bivalvia, including the subclass Pteriomorphia.  However, the following taxonomy represents the current accepted arrangement of this subclass according to the World Register of Marine Species

Subclass: Pteriomorphia

Order: Arcida
(Ark shells and bittersweet shells)
Superfamily: Arcoidea
Family: Arcidae
Family: Cucullaeidae
Family: Glycymerididae
Family: Noetiidae
Family: Parallelodontidae
Superfamily: Limopsoidea
Family: Limopsidae
Family: Philobryidae

Order: Ostreida
(True oysters and their allies)
Superfamily: Ostreoidea
Family: Gryphaeidae, the foam oysters or honeycomb oysters
Family: Ostreidae, the true oysters

Order: Pectinida
(Scallops and their allies)
Superfamily: Anomioidea
Family: Anomiidae, the jingle shells and saddle oysters
Family: Placunidae
Superfamily: Plicatuloidea
Family: Plicatulidae, the kittenpaws
Superfamily: Dimyoidea
Family: Dimyidae, the dimyarian oysters
Superfamily: Pectinoidea
Family: Entoliidae, the entoliids
Family: Pectinidae, the scallops
Family: Propeamussiidae, the mud scallops
Family: Spondylidae, the thorny oysters

Order: Limida
(File shells and their allies)
Superfamily: Limoidea
Family: Limidae, the file shells

Order: Mytilida
(Saltwater mussels)
Superfamily: Mytiloidea
Family: Mytilidae, the sea mussels

Order: Pteriida
(Winged oysters and their allies)
Superfamily: Pinnoidea
Family: Pinnidae, the pen shells
Superfamily: Pterioidea
Family: Malleidae, the hammer oysters
Family: Pteriidae, the feather oysters
Family: Pulvinitidae, the pulvinitids

Fossil orders
 Cyrtodontida†
 Praecardiida†

References

Bivalve taxonomy
Mollusc subclasses